The Firm was an American hip hop supergroup that formed in New York City in 1996. It was created by rapper Nas, his manager Steve Stoute, producer Dr. Dre and production team Trackmasters. The group is composed of East Coast-based rappers Nas, Foxy Brown, AZ and Cormega. Rapper Nature is a former member: he served as a replacement for Cormega after he was ousted from the group.

Although the group received initial hype and high expectations from fans upon their formation after collectively signing to Dr. Dre's Aftermath label, The Firm's debut album, The Album (1997), generated disappointing sales and generally negative criticism. The album, which featured predominant mafioso rap-themes and production from Dr. Dre and the Trackmasters, was criticized for its pop-orientation. Their debut album was the group's only release and they disbanded in 1999 with each member continuing their solo careers.

The members (including Cormega, who had made up with Nas after their falling-out, and excluding Nature) reunited on Nas' 2020 album King's Disease on the track "Full Circle". Dr. Dre has outro vocals on the song.

Background 
The Firm's origins lie in the recording of Nas' studio album It Was Written (1996), which included a collaboration on the song "Affirmative Action" with East Coast-based rappers AZ, Cormega, and Foxy Brown. The supergroup was a project created by rapper Nas, his manager Steve Stoute, West Coast-based rapper and producer Dr. Dre, and production team the Trackmasters. The resulting line-up included Nas, Brown, AZ and rapper Nature. Cormega had been ousted from the group and was replaced by Nature prior to recording The Firm's debut, due to artistic differences between him and Nas, as well as contract disagreements with Nas's manager Steve Stoute. According to Poke & Tone, 50 Cent and Mary J. Blige were tentatively considered for the group.

Prior to their formation, the members were at transitional stages of their careers, as Nas had commercialized his musical style with his second album, Foxy Brown had earned her first recording contract, AZ had gained critical acclaim for his 1995 debut album Doe or Die (1995), and Cormega had chosen to continue his rapping career after his release from prison in 1995. The project also served as an attempt by Dr. Dre to focus on producing other artists work rather than his solo work, following his departure from Death Row Records and the formation of his Aftermath label, which the group was collectively signed to. After the announcement of the group's formation by Dr. Dre, all involved with the project hyped it heavily, creating considerable buzz.

The Album 
The group's only studio album, The Album (1997) was a concept album that revolved around mafioso rap-themes, and featured production work from Dr. Dre and the Trackmasters. While anticipated with much hype, The Album received generally negative reviews and generated disappointing sales upon its release.

Despite the group's excessive hype and its mainstream musical approach, The Firm did not meet the expectations of fans who were introduced to the group via It Was Written, and The Album was criticized by music writers for abandoning hip hop for R&B and pop style. Nas appeared to be seeking pop stardom.

Aftermath 
The Firm disbanded the following year and its members continued their solo careers. Nas' and Dr. Dre's participation in the group furthered speculation by fans and critics that the two artists were losing their creativity and appeal. Their work during this period has since been considered the weakest and least successful of their careers.

The replacing of Cormega with rapper Nature strained his friendship with Nas. Cormega, who continued to resent being ousted from the group, released the white label "Fuck Nas & Nature", circulating it through the mixtape market. Nature retaliated through a verse contribution on a DJ Clue mixtape. The two have since ended their beef and have recorded and performed together. After a short-lived truce, Nas attacked Cormega on the diss track "Destroy & Rebuild" from his fifth studio album Stillmatic (2001).

In December 2006, Cormega, Foxy Brown and Nas reunited to perform "Affirmative Action" live on-stage, ending the beef between Cormega and Nas. A reunion was unconfirmed. In an August 2010 interview with MTV, Foxy Brown explained there have been recent discussions on a Firm reformation, dependent on the remaining four agreeing to it.

Reunion
In August 2020, the group reunited for the song "Full Circle" from Nas' album King's Disease.

Discography

Studio albums

References

Bibliography

External links
 
 The Firm at Discogs

Aftermath Entertainment artists
African-American musical groups
Hip hop groups from New York City
Interscope Records artists
Musical groups disestablished in 1998
Musical groups established in 1996
Musical groups reestablished in 2020
Hip hop supergroups
Nas
Foxy Brown (rapper)
Hardcore hip hop groups
1996 establishments in New York City